Western Flyer may mean:
Western Flyer, an American country group
Western Flyer (Australian group), an Australian group from the 1970s
Western Flyer (bicycle), an American bicycle sold by Western Auto
Western Flyer (boat), an American boat chartered by John Steinbeck
New Flyer Industries, a Canadian bus manufacturer formerly known as Western Flyer Coach